Christoph & Lollo are a musical comedy duo from Vienna, Austria, made up of singer Christoph Drexler and guitarist Lollo Pichler.

The band became famous for their Schispringerlieder (skijumpersongs), humorous songs about skijumpers, often depicting them as sad and miserable. Their first song Lebkuchenherz, a ballad telling the story of Frantisek Jez, was regularly aired on the Austrian radio station FM4 in 1997. In the following years the band released three albums with songs about skijumpers like Eddie "The Eagle" Edwards, Janne Ahonen and Kazuyoshi Funaki. 

In 2007, they won third place at the comedy contest Passauer Kabaretttage at the Scharfrichterhaus in Passau, Germany. In 2009, their YouTube recording of "Karl-Heinz", referring to the first name of ex-minister of finance, Karl-Heinz Grasser, became quite popular on Social Media, as it named a large number of politicians and high-level managers who have been involved in major corruption scandals by their first names, asking for justice but omitting their full names.

Discography 
 Schispringerlieder (1999)
 Mehr Schispringerlieder (2000)
 Schispringerlieder 3 (2003)
 Trotzdemtrotz (2005)
 Hitler, Huhn und Hölle! (2007)
 Tschuldigung. (2011)
 Das ist Rock 'n' Roll (2014)
 Mitten ins Hirn (2018)

References

External links 
 christophundlollo.com
 kabarett.at

Austrian comedy duos
Austrian comedy musical groups